Heleen Jaques (born 20 April 1988) is a Belgian former footballer who played as a defender for Gent of the Belgian Super League and the Belgium national team.

Club career
Jaques made her Champions League debut in October 2012. She has also played for Herforder SV and Turbine Potsdam of the Bundesliga, and Sint-Truiden, Anderlecht and Club Brugge of the Belgian First Division and BeNe League. She transferred to Fiorentina for the 2018–19 season.

International career
Jaques was a member of the Belgium national team since 2007.

She played her last international game on 1 December 2020 against Switzerland. Coming on as a substitute for Julie Biesmans, she played the last minutes in a 4–0 win for Belgium where they secured qualification for the 2022 UEFA Women's Euro championship.

Career statistics 
Scores and results list Belgium's goal tally first, score column indicates score after each Jaques goal.

References

External links 

 
 
 Player German domestic football stats  at DFB
 

1988 births
People from Tielt
Living people
Footballers from West Flanders
Belgian women's footballers
Belgium women's international footballers
Belgium women's youth international footballers
Super League Vrouwenvoetbal players
BeNe League players
Frauen-Bundesliga players
Serie A (women's football) players
Women's association football defenders
1. FFC Turbine Potsdam players
RSC Anderlecht (women) players
Club Brugge KV (women) players
Fiorentina Women's F.C. players
K.A.A. Gent (women) players
Belgian expatriate women's footballers
Belgian expatriate sportspeople in Germany
Expatriate women's footballers in Germany
Belgian expatriate sportspeople in Italy
Expatriate women's footballers in Italy
UEFA Women's Euro 2017 players